The Armenian Shotokan Karate Federation, is the regulating body of Shotokan karate in Armenia, governed by the Armenian Olympic Committee. The headquarters of the federation is located in Yerevan.

History
The Armenian Shotokan Karate Federation is currently led by president Grigor Mikhayelyan, who is also the president of the Karate Federation of Armenia. Armenian shotokan karate athletes participate in various international shotokan championships, the Federation also hosts national level competitions. The Federation is a full member of the World Traditional Okinawa Karate-Do Federation.

See also
 Armenian Kyokushin Karate Federation
 Sport in Armenia

References

External links 
 Armenian Shotokan Karate Federation on Facebook

Sports governing bodies in Armenia
Shotokan
Karate in Armenia
Karate organizations